The 2022 North Dakota Secretary of State election was held on November 8, 2022, to elect the next secretary of state of North Dakota.  Incumbent Republican Alvin Jaeger did not seek reelection to an eighth term.

Republican primary

Candidates

Nominee
Michael Howe, state representative from the 22nd district (2016–present)

Eliminated in primary 
Marvin Lepp, businessman

Declined
Alvin Jaeger, incumbent secretary of state

Democratic-NPL primary

Candidates

Nominee
Jeffrey Powell, university administrator

Independent

Candidates

Rejected ballot 
Charles Tuttle, candidate for North Dakota's at-large congressional district in 2018 and North Dakota Superintendent of Public Instruction in 2020

General election

Predictions

References

Secretary of State
North Dakota
North Dakota Secretary of State elections